Eucalyptus pluricaulis, commonly known as the purple-leaved mallee, is a species of mallee that is endemic to Western Australia. It has smooth bark, dull bluish green, lance-shaped leaves, flower buds in groups of between nine and fifteen, pale yellow flowers and cylindrical to barrel-shaped fruit.

Description
It has smooth, greyish bark that is copper-coloured when new. Flowering occurs from March to September and the flowers are pale yellow.

Taxonomy
Eucalyptus pluricaulis was first formally described in 1991 by Ian Brooker and Stephen Hopper in the journal Nuytsia from specimens Brooker collected near the Coorow-Greenhead Road in 1982. The specific epithet (pluricaulis) is from the Latin plus, pluris meaning "more" or "several" and caulis meaning "stem", referring to the mallee habit of this eucalypt.

In the same journal, Brooker and Hopper described two subspecies and the names have been accepted by the Australian Plant Census:
 Eucalyptus pluricaulis Brooker & Hopper subsp. pluricaulis is an erect mallee with bluish green leaves and up to eleven buds in each group;
Eucalyptus pluricaulis subsp. prophyrea Brooker & Hopper is a low, straggly mallee with purplish leaves and up to fifteen flowers in each group.

Distribution and habitat
Subspecies pluricaulis grows in tall mallee, often on slopes near breakaways and is found from near Three Springs and the Lesueur National Park to Southern Cross and Ravensthorpe. Subspecies porphyrea grows in mallee between Tarin Rock, the Fitzgerald River National Park and the Stirling Range.

Conservation status
Both subspecies of this mallee eucalypt are classified as "not threatened" by the Western Australian Government Department of Parks and Wildlife.

See also
List of Eucalyptus species

References

Eucalypts of Western Australia
Trees of Australia
pluricaulis
Myrtales of Australia
Plants described in 1991
Taxa named by Ian Brooker
Taxa named by Stephen Hopper